The name Connie has been used for one tropical cyclone in the Atlantic Ocean, and has been retired for severe destruction in 1955.

 Hurricane Connie (1955), struck the US coast from North Carolina to New England

The name has been used for three tropical cyclones in the Eastern Pacific Ocean.
 Hurricane Connie (1966), no reported damage or deaths
 Tropical Storm Connie (1970), stalled 118 mi (190 km) from Clarion Island; did not make landfall
 Hurricane Connie (1974), never made landfall

The name has been used for one tropical cyclone in the Western Pacific Ocean.
 Typhoon Connie (1945), did not make landfall

The name has been used for two tropical cyclones in the Southwest Indian Ocean.
 Cyclone Connie (1964)
 Cyclone Connie (2000), affected the islands of Mauritius and Réunion

The name has been used for two tropical cyclones in the Australian region.
 Cyclone Connie (1966)
 Cyclone Connie (1987), near Western Australia

Atlantic hurricane set index articles
Pacific hurricane set index articles
Pacific typhoon set index articles
South-West Indian Ocean cyclone set index articles
Australian region cyclone set index articles